South Carolina Highway 101 (SC 101) is a  state highway in Laurens, Spartanburg, and Greenville counties in the U.S. state of South Carolina. Its southern terminus is at an intersection with U.S. Route 76 (US 76) in Hickory Tavern, and its northern terminus is at an intersection with SC 11 near Landrum.

Route description
SC 101 begins in Hickory Tavern at US 76 and heads northwest. At the intersection of State Road S-30-20, the highway then turns to the northeast and heads toward Gray Court. It intersects SC 14 in downtown and then interchanges with I-385 at exit 16 while it continues northeast. Northwest of Woodruff, the highway then heads west, remaining concurrent with SC 146. It intersects with SC 418 as it exits town. Outside the city limits of Woodruff, SC 101 splits from SC 146 and heads northwest, intersecting SC 417 and SC 296.

Northwest of Reidville, the highway interchanges with I-85 at exit 60, forming a parclo interchange. Continuing into Greer, the highway passes Greenville-Spartanburg International Airport before intersecting SC 80. In Greer, the highway intersects with SC 357's southern terminus and becomes concurrent with SC 290 heading west. After about a tenth of a mile, SC 101 tracks north, crossing over the South Tyger River before making its way through Highland, and running concurrent with SC 414 for a tenth of a mile before continuing northwest. The route reaches its northern terminus at SC 11 in northern Greenville County.

Major intersections

Greer truck route

South Carolina Highway 101 Truck (SC 101 Truck) is a  truck route that is partially within the city limits of Greer. It has concurrencies with SC 80 and SC 14.

The truck route begins at an intersection with the SC 101 mainline at that highway's intersection with SC 80 (J. Verne Smith Parkway) in the southern part of Greer, which is in the southwestern part of Spartanburg County. This intersection is just north of the Greenville–Spartanburg International Airport. SC 80 and SC 101 Truck travel to the southwest, skirting along the southern edges of the city. They travel through rural portions of the city, just to the west of the airport. Just past an intersection with the southern terminus of Poplar Street Extension, they enter the east-central part of Greenville County. Just before an intersection with the southern terminus of Old Highway 14 South (a former portion of SC 14), they curve to the west and leave the airport area. After a slight bend to the west-southwest, they intersect SC 14 and the eastern terminus of Tandem Drive. Here, SC 80 reaches its western terminus, and SC 101 Truck turns right to follow SC 14 north to the north-northwest. Immediately, they temporarily leave the city limits of Greer. They curve to the northeast and begin a curve back to the north-northwest. At an intersection with the southern terminus of SC 14 Truck (South Buncombe Road), they re-enter the city. This intersection leads to Greenville Technical College's Benson Campus, North Greenville University, and Prisma Health Greer Memorial Hospital. They curve to the northeast and intersect the eastern terminus of West Road and the western terminus of Roscoe Road, where they leave the city limits again. A short distance later, they re-enter the city for the final time. At an intersection with Donaldson Avenue, they begin a curve to the north-northwest. After a slight bend to the north-northeast, they travel on a bridge over some railroad tracks of Norfolk Southern Railway. Then, they cross over some railroad tracks of CSX. Just past the northern terminus of School Street, they pass the Greer Heritage Museum. At Poinsett Street, they intersect SC 101/SC 290. Here, SC 101 Truck ends, and SC 14 continues to the northeast.

See also

References

External links

SC 101 at Virginia Highways' South Carolina Highways Annex

101
Transportation in Laurens County, South Carolina
Transportation in Spartanburg County, South Carolina
Transportation in Greenville County, South Carolina
Greer, South Carolina